Gnoristinae is a subfamily of fungus gnats in the family Mycetophilidae. There are about 6 genera and at least 4 described species in Gnoristinae.

Genera
Aglaomyia Vockeroth, 1980
Apolephthisa Grzegorzek, 1885
Boletina Staeger, 1840
Coelosia Winnertz, 1863
Creagdhubhia Chandler, 1999
Dziedzickia Johannsen, 1909
Ectrepesthoneura Enderlein, 1911
Gnoriste Meigen, 1818
Grzegorzekia Edwards, 1941
Palaeodocosia Meunier, 1904
Saigusaia Vockeroth, 1980
Synapha Meigen, 1818
Syntemna Winnertz, 1863
Tetragoneura Winnertz, 1846

References

Further reading

 Arnett, Ross H. (2000). American Insects: A Handbook of the Insects of America North of Mexico. CRC Press.

External links

 Diptera.info
 NCBI Taxonomy Browser, Gnoristinae

Mycetophilidae
Nematocera subfamilies